Patrick Huse (born April 1, 1948) is a Norwegian painter and multimedia artist. He studied landscape art and conceptualism during the late 1970s and early 1980s. His works incorporate techniques as painting, drawing, photograph, video, wall based text material and objects. His work is described by Matthew Kangas, Seattle’s leading critic for thirty years, interprets Patrick Huse’s art in the light of this narrative when he gave a great deal of praise in the Seattle Times about “Rift” in the Frye Art Museum, 2000: “Dark, cloudy and moody, Huse's pictures are part of a long, gloomy tradition of northern European landscape tradition. In the early 1990s he started a project titled Rethinking Landscape, trilogy consisting of the three parts: 1 Nordic Landscape, 2 RIFT and 3 Penetration. The traditional landscape art still plays a role as an artistic reference, but through a series of exhibitions from the mid-1990s and later, he has challenged landscape art in a way which makes his project unique. For many years through his interest for indigenous people and tradition in the Arctic Patrick Huse extensively travelled the north and his work in a period of twelve years resulted in an approach to art through a crossover between art and anthropology. This was concluded in a trilogy called Northern Imaginary which was under production for nine years.

Patrick Huse has worked extensively with larger pedagogical museum art projects connected to Northern issues for many years. Produced books connected to the different projects. Social research in Arctic Canada, Greenland, Iceland and the Nordic countries and cooperated with a large number of academics from several universities. The books are used as text books in academic courses in universities and university colleges.

In his entire body of work, Patrick Huse argues the use of elements taken from nature and culture in the northern areas becomes an invitation to associate with working on the relationship – center and periphery, one of the most repeated topics for structuring the geographical relationship between north and south. The choice of geographical location forces the artist and viewer to relate to places where the basis of existence is so meager that existence itself is stretched to its limits. One can claim that there is a desire to place oneself in a type of challenge which one does not go through unchanged and addresses a freedom of speech in contradiction to any ideology.

Gallery 

Title: Discharge and Fermentation, Oil on canvas, 201x382 cm, 1998–2008, Pori Art Museum, Finland, Patrick Huse

Title: Landscape Flow, Technique: Oil on canvas, 190 x 190 cm, Reykjavik Art Museum, Iceland

Title: Fragile Painting / 2010, Technique: Oil on canvas, 75 x 90 cm / 30 x 36 inches, Lillerhammer Art Museum, Norway

Title: Landscape Flow Iceland, 2005, Technique: Oil on canvas / Photo, 180 x 540 cm / 72 x 280 inches, Patrick Huse, National Museum of Art, Norway

Title: Technique: Oil on canvas / Photo, Size: 180 x 540 cm / 72 x 280 inches, Sparebankstiftelsen DNB Nor, Norway

References 
 Nordic Landscapes, JW Cappelen Publishing House 1994 -  
 Rift, Aschehoug Publishing House 1998 -  
 Penetration, Stenersen Museum / Delta Press 2001  -  
 Encounter, Lillehammer Art Museum / Delta Press 2003 -  
 East Greenland Impressions, Lillehammer Art Museum / Delta Press  2003 -  
 Intimate Absence,  Henie Onstad Art Center / Delta Press  2005 -  
 Northern Imaginary 3rd part, Production Delta Press, Norway / Pori Art Museum,   Finland 2008.

External links 
 Patrick Huse, Lillehammer Art Museum Norway
 Patrick Huse, Pori Art Museum, Finland
 Patrick Huse, Tromsø Kunstforening, Norway
 Patrick Huse List Icelandic Art News, Iceland
 http://publishedartdistribution.org
 http://patrick-huse.org
 http://worldcat.org/identities/lccn-n95111563/

1948 births
Living people
20th-century Norwegian painters
21st-century Norwegian painters
Norwegian male painters
Multimedia artists
20th-century Norwegian male artists
21st-century Norwegian male artists